In enzymology, a hypotaurocyamine kinase is an enzyme that catalyzes the chemical reaction

ATP + hypotaurocyamine  ADP + Nomega-phosphohypotaurocyamine

Thus, the two substrates of this enzyme are ATP and hypotaurocyamine, whereas its two products are ADP and Nomega-phosphohypotaurocyamine.

This enzyme belongs to the family of transferases, specifically those transferring phosphorus-containing groups (phosphotransferases) with a nitrogenous group as acceptor.  The systematic name of this enzyme class is ATP:hypotaurocyamine N-phosphotransferase.

References 

 

EC 2.7.3
Enzymes of unknown structure